Anne Rowe Hupp (1757 – June 26, 1823) was an American frontierswoman of the Buffalo Creek Valley in Washington County, Pennsylvania. She led the defense of a small, isolated fort, Miller's Blockhouse, against a Shawnee Indian Attack, for more than twenty-four hours in 1782 while she was eight months pregnant.

Personal
Anne was the daughter of Adam Rowe, who himself survived an Indian massacre in November, 1776, which killed his wife and one son and left another son missing. Anne had remained at home on Buffalo Creek. Anne had married John Hupp, a pioneer in the Buffalo Creek Valley, about 1775. The couple had four children: Mary (b.1775), Margaret (ca.1779), John, Jr. (b.1780), and Elizabeth (ca.1781).

Anne later married John May and they had 3 children: Benjamin, Ann, and George.

Miller's Blockhouse
Another early settler, Jacob Miller, settled  of land on Buffalo Creek watershed in the 1770s. Here   he built "Miller’s Blockhouse", a fortified strong-point for protection against attack.

Indian attack

In early April 1782, a party of Shawnee attacked the area, and the settlers gathered in forts and blockhouses for protection. Many of the men were absent from Miller's Blockhouse, defending a nearby strong point known as Rice's Fort. Among the remaining defenders were John and Anne Hupp with their children. The attackers hid nearby, perhaps hoping to surprise the men returning home. A colt belonging to Jacob Miller, Sr. strayed in the night and, despite pleadings from Anne that she had had a dream presaging disaster, John Hupp set out with Jacob to retrieve him. Once away from the fort the pair were attacked and killed by Indians lying in wait. The fort was left with only one elderly man, with several women and children. Anne took charge of the defense. She attempted to send eleven-year-old Frederick Miller as a messenger to Rice's Fort, but he was attacked and driven back inside. Anne encouraged the defenders and they were able to keep the attackers at bay. Somewhat later three men happened to return from Rice's Fort, Jacob Rowe, Jacob Miller, Jr., and Philip Hupp (Jacob, Anne's brother, was a survivor of the 1776 attack that killed his mother and brother). The arrival of the three discouraged the attackers, who lingered in the area until dark and then left. The settlers suffered only the two fatalities of John Hupp and Jacob Miller.

Attacks continued in the area from April to May 1782.

References

External links

 Anne Hupp and the Siege of Miller's Blockhouse
 Historical Marker
Pennsylvania Museum and Historical Commission, Official Marker Record
 Creigh, Alfred., History of Washington County: From Its First Settlement to the Present Time, B. Singerly: Harrisburg, PA. 1871. p. 46-50 Link to Text
 Lewis, Mary Anne., "Tracking Down Settler's Forts," Pittsburgh Post-Gazette, 22 July 1998. Retrieved 27 June 2009 Link to Text

People of colonial Pennsylvania
People from Washington County, Pennsylvania
Women in the American Revolution
1757 births
1823 deaths
People of Pennsylvania in the American Revolution